Leo G. Adams (born September 11, 1937) was an American politician and mechanical engineer.

Adams lived in New Hope, Minnesota with his wife and family. He graduated from Minneapolis North High School, in Minneapolis, Minnesota, and then received his bachelor's degree in mechanical engineering from University of Minnesota. Adams also took graduate classes in business administration at the University of Minnesota. He served on the Minnesota State Board on Human Rights and on the Minnesota Public Service Commission. Adams served in the Minnesota House of Representatives from 1975 to 19980 when he resigned when he was appointed to the Public Service Commission. Adams was a Democrat.

References

1937 births
Living people
People from New Hope, Minnesota
University of Minnesota alumni
American mechanical engineers
Democratic Party members of the Minnesota House of Representatives